D.E.T.A. LLP operating as DETA Air was an  airline, with bases in Almaty and Shymkent, Kazakhstan. Their principal airline routes were to Hong Kong and Istanbul.

History
DETA was founded in 2003. The company performed a variety of passenger and cargo transportation services. Structurally, DETA was subdivided into air company, tourist company, air ticket selling agency and cargo services. The company ceased operations in 2013.

Destinations
DETA Air served the following per schedules:

Shanghai - Shanghai Pudong International Airport (Cargo)
Hohot - Hohhot Baita International Airport charter

Tbilisi - Tbilisi International Airport charter

Almaty - Almaty International Airport
Shymkent - Shymkent Airport

Hong Kong International Airport (Cargo)

Istanbul - Sabiha Gokcen International Airport (Cargo)

Fleet
The DETA Air fleet consists the following aircraft as of June 2013

Former fleet:
1 Boeing 737-500, UP-B3708 sold to Aerosvit in 2012
3 Ilyushin Il-62, one sold to Trust Air in 2012, rest retired in 2013

References

External links

Defunct airlines of Kazakhstan
Airlines established in 2003
Airlines disestablished in 2013
Airlines formerly banned in the European Union
Defunct cargo airlines
2003 establishments in Kazakhstan
2013 disestablishments in Kazakhstan